Hidden Lake is located immediately east of Hidden Lake Peaks in North Cascades National Park, in the U. S. state of Washington. Hidden Lake is off designated trails but can reached by way a trailhead off the Cascade River Road from Snoqualmie National Forest. The distance from the trailhead to the lake is  one way to the overlook and another  rock scramble through a boulder field to the lakeshore.

References

Lakes of Washington (state)
North Cascades National Park
Lakes of Skagit County, Washington